The list of American films of 1912 is a compilation of American films released in the year 1912.

A-L

M-Z

See also
 1912 in the United States

External links

1912 films at the Internet Movie Database

1912
Films
Lists of 1912 films by country or language
1910s in American cinema